Happo may refer to:
Masan, formerly Happo,  city in South Korea
Happō, Akita, town in Japan